Estadio de Beisbol Veinte de Noviembre is a stadium in San Luis Potosí, San Luis Potosí, Mexico.  It is primarily used for baseball, and is the home field of the San Luis Potosí Tuneros Mexican League baseball team.  It holds 6,500 people. By now, it is also used for concerts and mass audience events.  It is named to commemorate Día de la Revolución: 20 November 1910, which marked the start of the Mexican Revolution.

References 

Mexican League ballparks
Sports venues in San Luis Potosí